Jang Yeong-sil (1390 – after 1442) was a Korean mechanical engineer, scientist, and inventor during the Joseon Dynasty (1392–1897). Although Jang was born as a peasant,  King Sejong allowed Jang to work at the royal  palace. Jang's inventions, such as the Cheugugi (the rain gauge) and the water gauge, highlight the technological advancements of the Joseon Dynasty.

Early years
Jang Yeong-sil's birth is recorded only in the genealogy of the Jang family and in the Annals of the Joseon Dynasty. According to these records, his father, Jang Seong-hwi, was the 8th generation of the Jang family. Jang Seong-hwi was the 3rd of 5 brothers and all of the brothers previously were ministers of Goryeo. There are many historical records about his elder brother, Jang Seong-bal, who was born in 1344 and his grave located at Ui-seong in the province of Gyeongbuk. The Annals state that Yeong-sil's mother was a gwangi (gisaeng), assigning them (Yeong-sil and his mother) the social status of gwanno, (a servant in civil service district courts).

Civil service
Jang's fame gained him entry into the royal court at Hanseong (present-day Seoul), where selected commoners displayed their talents before the king and his advisers. Jang met Sejong's expectations in crafts and engineering, and allowed Jang to work as a government official in the palace. The talented scientists recruited under Sejong's new program worked at the Hall of Worthies (집현전; 集賢殿; Jiphyeonjeon).

Astronomical instruments

Sejong's first assignment to Jang was to build a celestial globe to measure astronomical objects. Books obtained from Arabian and Chinese scholars were not complete in their instructions, for these devices could also be used for military purposes. After two months of study, Jang made a spherical device that could perform with mediocre accuracy. In 1433, a year after his first attempt, Jang made an armillary sphere known as the honcheonui (혼천의, 渾天儀). Honcheonui depended on a waterwheel to rotate the internal globe to indicate time. Whether day or night, this allowed the instrument to be updated on the positions of the sun, moon, and the stars. Later celestial globes (gyupyo (규표)) could measure time changes according to the seasonal variations. These instruments, along with the sundials and water clocks, were stationed around the Gyeongnghoeru Pavilion in Gyeongbok Palace and put into use by the astronomers. The success of Jang's astronomical machines was marked in 1442 AD when the Korean astronomers compiled their computations on the courses of the seven heavenly objects (five visible planets, the sun, and moon) in Chiljeongsan (칠정산), an astronomical calendar that made it possible for scientists to calculate and accurately predict all the major heavenly phenomena, such as solar eclipses and other stellar movements.

Iron printing press
Although Choe Yun-ui (최윤의) invented the world's first metal printing press in 1234 during the Goryeo Dynasty, Sejong asked scientists at Jiphyeonjeon to build a better printing press. In 1434, scientists accomplished building Gabinja (갑인자, 甲寅字), which was made of copper-zinc and lead-tin alloys. It was said to be twice as fast as the previous printing presses and printed Chinese characters in astounding beauty and clarity. Gabinja was reproduced six times during the next 370 years.

Water clock

Samguk Sagi records that an office overseeing the use of water clocks had been established during the Three Kingdoms Period. The Korean water clock consisted of two stacked jars of water, with water dropping from the top to the bottom at a measured rate. The level of the water indicated the time of the day. This was very inconvenient because a person had to be always be on guard, so that a drum could be banged at each hour to inform the public of the current time.

Self-striking water clocks were not new, having already been invented by the Arabians and the Chinese (in 1091). Upon hearing about the usage of self-striking water clocks in foreign countries, Sejong assigned Jang and other scientists to build a clock emulating such automatic devices. After their initial attempts failed in developing an operational water clock, Jang traveled to China to study the various designs of water clocks. When he returned in 1434, Jang created Korea's first self-striking water clock, the Jagyeokru (자격루), which would mark the hour automatically with the sounds of a bell, gong, and drum, and was used to keep the standard of time in Joseon. This water clock was not preserved well and did not survive; however, reconstructions of the Jagyeokru based on text descriptions have been made.

Circling the clock were 12 wooden figures that served as indicators of time.  There were 4 water containers, 2 jars that received the water, and 12 arrows floating inside the lower container. As the water from the upper containers seeped down the pipe to the lower container, one of the arrows would tilt a board filled with small iron balls; a ball would roll down a pipe to a container of larger iron balls. The collision would cause the larger balls to travel down a lower pipe and hit a giant cymbal, announcing the time to the community.  A ball would then land on another container, which was part of a complex system of levers and pulleys that moved wooden figures to indicate the time visually.

Sundial

Jang's invention of the water clock saw its infusion throughout the country, however, these were very costly. Development of the sundial provided a cheaper and more manageable alternative. Jang, Ichun, Kimjo, and other scientists made Korea's first sundial, the Angbu-ilgu (앙부일구/), which meant "pot-shaped sun clock staring at the sky". Angbu-ilgu was bronze in composition, and consisted of a bowl marked with 13 meters to indicate time and 4 legs jointed by a cross at the base. Seven lines crossed the 13 meters in different curves to compensate for the seasonal changes of the course of the sun.  Angbu-ilgu and other variants, such as the Hyeonju Ilgu (현주일구/) and the Cheonpyeong Ilgu (천평일구/), were implemented in strategic spots, such as the town's main streets with heavy traffic, so that the people could be well informed of the time. To compensate for the high illiteracy rate among the commoners, 12 shapes of the Chinese zodiac were engraved in juxtaposition with the meters. No sundials from the Joseon Dynasty made during King Sejong's reign still exist today; none are known to have survived past the Japanese invasions of Korea (1592–1598) (임진왜란).

Research on weaponry
When Sejong learned of reports that Korean melee weapons were duller and somewhat heavier than those of the neighboring countries, he sent Jang to Gyeongsang Province, where Jang had spent his earlier life developing metal alloys for various weapons and tools. Since Jang used to be a gwanno (관노/) (a man-slave in government employ), he had already acquired much knowledge about metal working, and also knew the geography of the area. Jang surveyed the available metals and their characteristics, and presented his research to Sejong and the generals, contributing to the development of Korean weaponry.

Rain gauge
The Korean economy during the Joseon Dynasty was agriculturally based and vulnerable to prolonged or consecutively occurring droughts; therefore, there was a need for better ways to manage water. Although rain gauges had been used in ancient Greece and India, Jang invented Korea's first rain gauge in 1441, called cheugugi (측우기/), and, by 1442, a standardized rain gauge with dimensions of 42.5 cm (height) and 17 cm (diameter) was introduced throughout the country to gather data on the yearly averages of precipitation throughout the different regions of the country.

Water gauge
To allow better water management, Sejong asked the scientists to figure out some ways to inform the farmers of the available amount of water; and, in 1441, Jang invented the world's first water gauge, called Supyo (수표/). It was a calibrated stone column placed in the middle of a body of water, connected by a stone bridge.

Expulsion
Jang's extraordinary accomplishments earned him the trust of Sejong. Some government officials were very jealous of Jang, especially when he had achieved so much despite his common origin. Furthermore, the Korean Confucianism that was deeply rooted in Joseon's society viewed scientists and engineers in low esteem, similar to the likes of craftsmen.

In 1442, Sejong ordered Jang to build a gama, an elaborately decorated Korean sedan chair. The gama broke while Sejong was traveling, and Jang was held responsible. Although Sejong was against the decree, Jang was jailed for an extended period of time and expelled from the royal palace. Later events of Jang's life, including the date of his death, were not recorded. It is unlikely, but possible that Jang Yeong-sil may have died during the reign of Joseon's 7th king, Sejo of Joseon (r. 1455–1468).

Popular culture
 Portrayed by Lee Chun-hee in the 2008 KBS2 TV series King Sejong the Great.
 Portrayed by Im Hyung-joon in the 2012 film I Am the King.
 Portrayed by Kim Seul-gi in the 2015 MBC TV series Splash Splash Love.
 Portrayed by Song Il-gook in the 2016 KBS1 TV series Jang Yeong-sil.
 Portrayed by Choi Min-sik in the 2019 film Forbidden Dream.

Tribute
On May 19, 2018, Google celebrated Jang Yeong-sil with a Google Doodle.

See also
Hwacha
Science and technology in Korea
Sundial
Water clock
Woo Jang-choon

References

External links

Newton Graphic Science Magazine, biography (in Korean)
Youth Korea Times article  (in Korean)
Seoul National University profile (in Korean)

14th-century births
Astronomers
Jang clan of Asan
15th-century Korean people
Korean scientists
Korean inventors
15th-century Korean astronomers
Year of birth unknown
Year of death unknown
Medieval Korean scientists